Airforce Station Purnea  is located near Purnia in the state of Bihar, India. This is the base of Indian Air Force. This airport was built for supplies to Indian Army in Sino-Indian War.

Recent development
It has been selected in UDAN 4 scheme of the Government of India. Airport Authority of India has given official nod for flight operations though in bidding process none of Airlines shown interest.
The Government of Bihar too unable to acquire whole 50 acres land for the construction of passenger terminal, VVIP lounge, cargo terminal and 3 acres for road connectivity which is incomplete due to various court cases flied by some farmers in Patna High Court . Runway is being repaired to facilitate landing of multiple flights. It will benefit the people of Eastern region of Bihar, Jharkhand and Eastern Terai region of Nepal, especially Madhepura, Purnia, Katihar, Araria, Kishanganj, Bhagalpur, Sahibganj and Biratnagar. 
Recently the land acquisition has finished and the land is handed over to state aviation department.

See also
 Gaya Airport
 Darbhanga Airport
 Jay Prakash Narayan Airport
 Raxaul Airport
 Sabeya Airport

References 

Airports in Bihar
Proposed airports in Bihar
Purnia
Military airbases established in 1962
1962 establishments in Bihar